Hector McLennan was a Scottish Australian Suffragist and ship merchant.

Born in Glasgow, McLennan emigrated to South Australia where he was co-secretary of the Women's Suffrage League with Mary Lee.

McLennan was Manager and South Australian representative of Messers Howard W Smith and Sons and in 1900 moved to Victoria to manage its Melbourne office.  He later opened a Melbourne Office for coal merchants James and Alexander Brown of Newcastle, New South Wales.

McLennan died in Armadale, Victoria on 4 December 1923 after a long illness.  He left a widow and four married daughters.

References

Year of birth missing
1923 deaths
Australian suffragists
Scottish emigrants to colonial Australia
Male feminists
Businesspeople from Glasgow
20th-century Australian businesspeople
19th-century Australian businesspeople